Mary Margaret Bartelme (July 24, 1866 – July 25, 1954) was a pioneering American judge and lawyer, particularly in the area of juvenile justice. She was the first woman appointed Cook County Public Guardian in Illinois in 1897, and the first woman elected judge in a court of high jurisdiction in the state in 1923. Earlier, appointed a judge assistant in 1913, she began hearing court cases involving juveniles and was referred to at that time as, "America's only woman judge", by The New York Times.

Early years
Mary Bartelme was born in Chicago, the daughter of an immigrant from Saarland, Germany, Balthasar Bartelme and his wife Jeannette. She had three sisters and two brothers, and attended West Division High School. She graduated from Cook County Normal School, a teachers' college, and taught for five years, before deciding to attend law school, at the age of 25. In 1892, she enrolled at Northwestern University School of Law, from which she graduated; she was admitted to the Illinois Bar by 1894.

Professional career
Known as a social reformer, during the Progressive Era, Mary Bartelme devoted much of her life to the reform of juvenile laws and the welfare of children.  In 1897, she was named Cook County Public Guardian, the first woman in this post. She became known throughout Illinois as a tireless advocate for children; her compassion for the girls who came before her earned her the nickname "Mother Barthelme." She would later acquire another nickname, "Suitcase Mary," because when she sent girls to foster homes, she always provided them with clean clothes, packed in a new suitcase.

Bartelme believed that there was dramatic social neglect of girls, that parents must speak frankly with their daughters about sex, and that poverty was the main cause of delinquency. In May 1912, she was named an Assistant Judge in the Juvenile Court of Cook County. Then, in March 1913 Bartelme convened a special Girls' Court, which heard cases of delinquent and dependent girls, many of them prostitutes. All personnel in this closed court were female, which was felt to encourage a more open discussion of sexual and other private matters. Bartelme later established three Mary Clubs for girls who were not able to return to their parents, supported by volunteer services, as an alternative to state institutions. The first two clubs, which started in 1914 and 1916, accepted white girls; the last one, started in 1921, accepted girls of color. More than 2,000 girls passed through these group homes in a space of ten years.

Throughout her career, Bartleme received national and international visitors, who came to study her pioneering work. She was featured in the May 25, 1913, issue of The New York Times Magazine in an article entitled, "America's Only Woman Judge Is Doing a Big Work". In the 1916-1917, she served as vice chair of the National Woman's Party. 

In late 1923, she was elected Judge of the Circuit Court of Cook County, and she was re-elected in 1927. After a distinguished career, she retired in June 1933.   Prior to her official retirement, in May, more than 2000 well-wishers honored her with a luncheon, at which she was praised for her many achievements.

Later years

After she retired, Judge Bartelme moved to the west coast, residing in Carmel, California, where she lived with a niece. She occasionally returned to Chicago for a visit. In California, she continued to do speaking engagements, discussing the need to improve the juvenile justice system. In 1936, she received Primary Class Instruction in Christian Science from Bicknell Young CSD, having been a practising Christian Scientist for many years. She died in late July 1954, at age 88. One of her final requests was that upon her death, in lieu of flowers, donations would be made to the Mary Bartelme Clubs, which were still in operation.

Mary Bartelme would later be described as the single most important person in the first 25 years of the Cook County Juvenile Court, the first juvenile court established in the U.S.

Legacy
In September 1957, a new Chicago elementary school that was named for her opened. It was able to accommodate more than 400 students. The school was located on Ridge in Rogers Park. It was torn down sometime in the 1970s to make way for a senior citizen apartment home.

Mary Bartelme Park, in the West Loop area of Chicago, is also named in her honor.

See also
List of first women lawyers and judges in Illinois
List of first women lawyers and judges in the United States

References

Further reading
Mary Bartelme's papers are housed at the University of Illinois at Chicago, where they are part of the Jane Addams Memorial Collection.
 

American women judges
Illinois lawyers
Juvenile law
Lawyers from Chicago
1866 births
1954 deaths
People from Carmel-by-the-Sea, California
Northwestern University Pritzker School of Law alumni
Judges of the Circuit Court of Cook County (pre-1964 reorganization)
19th-century American women lawyers
19th-century American lawyers
National Woman's Party activists